Gallaecimonas pentaromativorans  is a Gram-negative, rod-shaped and halotolerant bacterium from the genus of Gallaecimonas which has been isolated from sediments of the Corcubion Ria in A Coruña in Spain.

References

 

Gammaproteobacteria
Bacteria described in 2010